Malol is an Austronesian language of the Malol village area in Mainyen ward, West Aitape Rural LLG, coastal Sandaun Province, Papua New Guinea.

External links 
 Paradisec has a number of collections that include Malol materials

References

Schouten languages
Languages of Papua New Guinea